"Lies" is a song written by Beau Charles and Buddy Randell, performed by The Knickerbockers; the single was produced by Jerry Fuller. It reached #20 on the U.S. pop chart in 1966.  It was featured on their 1966 album Lies and is famous for often being mistaken for a Beatles track due to its similarities to their style and harmonies.

Background
Here is what original Knickerbockers member Beau Charles said about the song's behind-the-scenes story:

"We desperately tried to write something that sounded like the British Invasion'. We wrote 'Lies' in less than one half hour. We demo-ed it in New York." After a Jerry Fuller inspired re-arrangement, the track was recorded at Sunset Sound in West Hollywood with Bruce Botnick as the Engineer. Things were not quite right, so the multi-track master was taken to Leon Russell's house in Hollywood Hills. Jerry Fuller knew Leon and "Leon had this great little studio - just a four track". The band recorded the vocals there and overdubbed a new guitar part that was recorded from a beat up old Fender guitar amp that gave the guitar sound a meaty, edgy feel".

Other versions
The Ventures on their 1965 album Where the Action Is.
Nancy Sinatra on her 1966 album Boots.
The T-Bones on their 1966 album No Matter What Shape (Your Stomach's In).
Gary Lewis & the Playboys on their 1967 album Gary Lewis & the Playboys.
Lulu on her 1966 album From Lulu...with Love.
Styx on their 1974 album Man of Miracles. Record World said that it's "one midwestern hit that still sounds like a national smash."
Tarney/Spencer Band on their 1979 album Run for Your Life.
Linda Ronstadt on her 1982 album Get Closer.
The Delmonas on their 1985 album Dangerous Charms.
The Undead on their 1986 album Never Say Die!
The Landlords on their 1987 EP Our Favorite Songs!
The Basement Wall on their 1993 compilation album There Goes the Neighborhood! Volume 2 Featuring The Basement Wall.
The Fireballs on their 2006 compilation album Firebeat! The Great Lost Vocal Album.
The Brymers on their 2007 compilation album Sacrifice.
The Black Belles as the B-side to their 2010 single "What Can I Do?"

See also
 List of 1960s one-hit wonders in the United States

References

1965 songs
1965 singles
The Ventures songs
Nancy Sinatra songs
Gary Lewis & the Playboys songs
Lulu (singer) songs
Styx (band) songs
Linda Ronstadt songs
The Fireballs songs
Song recordings produced by Jerry Fuller